Haapoja is a surname. Notable people with the surname include:

 Juho Haapoja (born 1980), Finnish boxer
 Matti Haapoja (1845–1895), Finnish murderer
 Susanna Haapoja (1966–2009), Finnish politician
 Terike Haapoja (born 1974), Finnish visual artist

Finnish-language surnames